Shayle Gardner (22 August 1890 – 17 May 1945) was a New Zealand actor.

Partial filmography
 The Indian Love Lyrics (1923)
 St. Elmo (1923)
 The Chinese Bungalow (1926)
 Tommy Atkins (1928)
 Sailors Don't Care (1928)
 The Three Passions (1929)
 Three Live Ghosts (1929)
 Disraeli (1929)
 The Alley Cat (1929)
 The Return of Dr. Fu Manchu (1930)
 Diamond Cut Diamond (1932)
 The Lodger (1932)
 Menace (1934)
 The Love Test (1935)
 Wolf's Clothing (1936)
 The Brown Wallet (1936)

References

External links

1890 births
1945 deaths
New Zealand male film actors
New Zealand male silent film actors
People from Auckland